Peeter Helme (born 6 September 1978 in Tallinn) is an Estonian writer, journalist, literary critic.

From 2014 he has been the literature editor for Vikerraadio. In 2020 he was convicted of attempted sexual enticement of minor.

He is the nephew of politician Mart Helme and first cousin of politician Martin Helme.

Selected works
 novel Puudutus, 2007
 short story Lihtne, 2008
 novel September, 2009
 short story Laps, 2010
 novel Varastatud aja lõpus, 2011
 horror story Saemehe töö,  2013
 novel Tuleviku mäletajad. Sofia,  2013
 short story Pringlikütid Vabaduse väljakul,  2014
 short novel Sügaval läänes, 2015

References

1978 births
Living people
Estonian journalists
Estonian critics
Estonian male novelists
Estonian male short story writers
University of Tartu alumni
21st-century Estonian writers
Writers from Tallinn
People from Tallinn